Jane Turner  (born 1 December 1960) is an Australian actress, comedian and Logie Award-winning comedy series creator and screenwriter.

Career 
Turner, although best known as a comedy performer, made her acting debut in the internationally renowned TV cult drama series Prisoner in a 15 episode guest role.

She is notable for numerous comedy roles including the sketch comedy programs The D-Generation, Fast Forward, Full Frontal, Big Girl's Blouse and Something Stupid.

On Fast Forward Turner (Svetta) recorded a song with cast member Peter Moon (comedian) (Victor), called "Don't Do Your Soviet Bloc".

In the 2000s Turner has received accolades for her performance in Kath & Kim, an ABC (later Seven Network) comedy series which she created, wrote, produced and starred in with her longtime friend and collaborator, Gina Riley. Kath & Kim became the most successful ABC syndicated show in Australian television history. Turner plays Kath Day Knight, one of the leading roles in the show and an occasional recurring character, Prue, a shop keeper at the Fountain Gate Shopping Centre.

Turner reprised the role in the 2005 telemovie. Da Kath & Kim Code and the 2012 feature film Kath & Kimderella

Turner made her West End theatrical debut in the Australian hit play Holding the Man at London's Trafalgar Studios in April 2010.

Personal life 
Turner attended Sacré Cœur School in Glen Iris, Melbourne, and later studied law at Monash University. Turner graduated from Monash with a Bachelor of Arts degree in 1988. She is married to lawyer John Denton and they have 3 children including model Anna Denton  and actor Nicholas Denton.

Filmography

References

External links 
 Kath & Kim BBC site

1960 births
Australian film actresses
Australian soap opera actresses
Australian television producers
Australian women television producers
Living people
Australian women comedians
Recipients of the Medal of the Order of Australia
20th-century Australian actresses
21st-century Australian actresses
People educated at Sacré Cœur School
People from Newcastle, New South Wales
Monash University alumni